Union Sportive Granville, commonly referred to as US Granville or simply Granville, is a French football club based in Granville in the Lower Normandy region.

History 
The club was founded in 1918 and currently plays in the Championnat de France amateur 2, the fifth division of French football, after most recently achieving promotion from the Division d'Honneur in the 2013–14 season. Granville share a partnership with nearby professional club SM Caen.

In season 2015–16 they had a fantastic run in the Coupe de France, eventually losing in the quarter finals:

In 2018, Granville beat Girondins de Bordeaux 2-1 in extra time, on 32e of Coupe de France.

Current squad

References

External links
 

Association football clubs established in 1918
Football clubs in France
1918 establishments in France
Sport in Manche
Football clubs in Normandy